The Perfect Husband: The Laci Peterson Story is a 2004 American made-for-television crime film based on the murder of Laci Peterson starring Dean Cain, Sarah Brown, Tracy Middendorf and Tom O'Brien.

Plot
The film is told through the perspectives of Scott and Laci Peterson's friends & family, who trusted and supported Scott until they could not believe him any more.

Laci Peterson was a pregnant mother-to-be. On Christmas Eve, 2002, she disappeared. Her husband Scott Peterson (Dean Cain), and her family go out to search for Laci, but there are no signs of her anywhere. Months go by, but the media and the public begin to suspect that Scott murdered his wife. The Rocha family support and defend Scott, until Scott's mistress Amber Frey (Tracy Middendorf) comes forward at a press conference and admits to an affair with Scott, and photographic proof confirming their relationship surfaces. The Rochas start to doubt Scott's innocence, especially Laci's mother, Sharon (Dee Wallace), who had always believed Scott to be the perfect husband. Finally, the Rocha family publicly announce that they no longer support Scott.

In April, 2003, the body of Laci and Scott's unborn son washed up on shore: the remains of a torso later identified as Laci washed up a few miles away from the baby's remains, and the two were officially declared murdered. Scott was arrested.

Cast
Dean Cain as Scott Peterson
Sarah Joy Brown as Kate Vignatti
David Denman as Tommy Vignatti 
Dee Wallace as Sharon Rocha
G. W. Bailey as Detective Gates 
Tracy Lynn Middendorf as Amber Frey
Paul Vincent O'Connor as Dennis Rocha
Peter Jason as Ron Grantski
Tom O'Brien as Detective Ross 
Tim Quill as Brent Rocha
Cindy Hogan as Kim Peterson
Palmer Davis as Angela Panati
Heidi Marnhout as Donna Taylor
Louise Gallagher as Jackie Peterson  
Joe Howard as Lee Peterson
Tina Molina as Amy Rocha
Dan Cashman as Mr. Whitman     
Jackson Jarvis as Sammy Vignatti 
Roark Critchlow as Todd Dewey
Erin McKinley as Babysitter
Meredith Leiber as Laci Peterson (uncredited)

DVD
The film was released on Region 1 DVD on June 8, 2004 through Sony Pictures and is rated PG-13. Widescreen format, with subtitles in English, Spanish, French and Thai.

References

External links
 

2004 television films
2004 films
Adultery in films
Biographical films about criminals
Crime films based on actual events
Films directed by Roger Young
USA Network original films